Laëtitia Marie Philippe (born 30 April 1991, in Chambéry) is a French football player who currently plays for French club Le Havre of the Division 1 Féminine. Philippe plays as a goalkeeper and is a member of the France women's national football team having made her debut on 21 November 2009 against Serbia.

Honours

SheBelieves Cup: Winner 2017

References

External links

 
 
 
 France player profile 
 Profile at Montpellier HSC 
 Player French football stats at footofeminin.fr 

1991 births
Sportspeople from Chambéry
Living people
French women's footballers
France women's youth international footballers
France women's international footballers
CNFE Clairefontaine players
Montpellier HSC (women) players
2011 FIFA Women's World Cup players
Women's association football goalkeepers
Division 1 Féminine players
GPSO 92 Issy players
FC Fleury 91 (women) players
Footballers from Auvergne-Rhône-Alpes
UEFA Women's Euro 2017 players